USNS Bridge (T-AOE-10), (formerly USS Bridge [AOE-10]), is the fourth ship of the  of fast combat support ships in the United States Navy. She is the second ship in the Navy named after Horatio Bridge, a Commodore who served during the Civil War. Bridge was commissioned on 5 August 1998.

History

2000s
On 29 June 2004, Bridge was formally decommissioned and transferred from the US Navy to Military Sealift Command (MSC).  Although the transfer to MSC occurred on 29 June 2004, the ceremony took place on 24 June 2004.Bridge no longer carries the weapons systems she had been equipped with. As a commissioned warship, Bridge was equipped with two Phalanx CIWS (Block I) mounts, one NSSM launcher (with two Mk 91 directors), two Mk. 38 25-mm chain guns, six .50 caliber heavy machine gun mounts, and two M60 GPMG mounts (on the bow), along with various small arms carried by her Navy crew.

2010s
In March 2011, in company with the carrier , Bridge was deployed off northeastern Honshu, Japan to assist with relief efforts after the 2011 Tōhoku earthquake and tsunami. After multiple inspections for radiation traces due to the Fukushima nuclear disaster, it was determined that it was unlikely the ship was exposed to the radiation leaking from the Fukushima Daiichi Nuclear Power Plant.

Bridge conducted 25 underway replenishment operations, delivering more than 1.8 million gallons of fuel in support of Operation Tomodachi. The ship was then decommissioned shortly after.
In April 2013, it was announced that MSC will take Bridge, and her sister ship , out of service in 2014 as a cost-saving measure. The ships' gas turbine propulsion make them faster than other Navy supply ships, but also make them consume more fuel.

As of 2018, Bridge was in reserve, at NISMF Bremerton. Two of her commanding officers, CAPT Rick Wren and CAPT Carol Pottenger have since gone on to achieve flag rank.

Notes

External links
Official US Navy ship website

 

Supply-class fast combat support ships
1996 ships